Mark Judson Goodspeed (December 1, 1956 – January 10, 1998) was an American football tackle. He played for the St. Louis Cardinals in 1980 and for the Birmingham Stallions in 1983.

References

1956 births
1998 deaths
American football tackles
Nebraska Cornhuskers football players
St. Louis Cardinals (football) players
Birmingham Stallions players